was a Japanese manga and woodblock artist. Born in Kokura, Fukuoka Prefecture,  marked his debut as a professional manga artist in 1977. Two years later, his most well-known work, Mandaraya no Ryouta, began to be published in Jitsugyo no Nihon Sha's Weekly Manga Sunday magazine. He also served as an instructor in Tokyo Polytechnic University's Department of Manga before he died on June 13, 2012, from an abdominal aortic aneurysm in Chōfu, Tokyo.

Works
 (Weekly Manga Sunday, Jitsugyo no Nihon Sha)
 (Weekly Manga Sunday, Jitsugyo no Nihon Sha)
 (Weekly Morning, Kodansha)
 (Weekly Morning, Kodansha)
 (Big Gold, Shogakukan)
 (Big Gold, Shogakukan)
 (Shōsetsu Shinchō, Shinchosha)
 (Comic Tom, Ushio Shuppan)
 (Monthly Comic Bingo, Bungeishunjū)
 (Jitsuwajidai, Media Boy)
 (Garo, Seirindō)

References

1950 births
2012 deaths
Artists from Fukuoka Prefecture
Manga artists from Fukuoka Prefecture